Stanwatkinsius is a genus of beetles in the family Buprestidae, the jewel beetles. They are native to Australia.

The genus was erected in 2001 for a few species of Cisseis. Several new species were then described. These beetles are less than a centimeter long. They are iridescent, often with colorful heads and bodies in shades of green or blue. Male and female are sometimes dimorphic. They are associated with Australian plants such as Grevillea, Hakea, Casuarina, and Allocasuarina.

Species include:

 Stanwatkinsius amanda Barker, 2007
 Stanwatkinsius careniceps (Carter, 1923)
 Stanwatkinsius cinctus (Kerremans, 1898)
 Stanwatkinsius constrictus (Blackburn, 1887)
 Stanwatkinsius crassus Barker & Bellamy, 2001
 Stanwatkinsius demarzi Barker & Bellamy, 2001
 Stanwatkinsius grevilleae Barker & Bellamy, 2001
 Stanwatkinsius kermeti Barker & Bellamy, 2001
 Stanwatkinsius lindi (Blackburn, 1887)
 Stanwatkinsius macmillani Barker & Bellamy, 2001
 Stanwatkinsius perplexa (Blackburn, 1887)
 Stanwatkinsius powelli Barker & Bellamy, 2001
 Stanwatkinsius rhodopus Barker & Bellamy, 2001
 Stanwatkinsius speciosus Barker & Bellamy, 2001
 Stanwatkinsius subcarinifrons (Thomson, 1879)
 Stanwatkinsius uniformis (Thomson, 1879)
 Stanwatkinsius viridimarginalis Barker & Bellamy, 2001

References

External links
Stanwatkinsius. Atlas of Living Australia.

Buprestidae genera
Beetles of Australia